The 2013–14 Prairie View A&M Lady Panthers basketball team represents Prairie View A&M University during the 2013–14 NCAA Division I women's basketball season. The Panthers, led by first year interim head coach Dawn Brown, play their home games at the William Nicks Building and were members of the Southwestern Athletic Conference. They finished the season with a record of 14–18 overall, 11–7 in SWAC play. They won the 2014 SWAC women's basketball tournament. They earn an automatic bid to the 2014 NCAA Division I women's basketball tournament which they lost in the first round to Connecticut.

Roster

Schedule

|-
!colspan=9| Regular Season

|-
!colspan=9| 2014 SWAC Basketball Tournament

|-
!colspan=9| 2014 NCAA tournament

See also
2013–14 Prairie View A&M Panthers basketball team

References

Prairie View A&M Lady Panthers basketball
Prairie View AandM
Prairie View